Equaldex is an online publication resource on LGBTQ rights. Subsections of the website are a collaborative knowledge base.

Equaldex publishes an annual ranking of LGBT rights by country and territory. As of September 2022, the head of Equaldex is Dan Leveille.

History

Equaldex Equality Index (2023) 
In 2023, the Equaldex Equality Index ranked the following countries best and worst for LGBT rights.

Best performing

Worst performing

Notes

References

External links
 

Human rights-related lists
LGBT rights by country
Social statistics data